This is a list of horror films released in the 1890s

List

See also
 Lists of horror films

References

Citations

Bibliography

 
 

1890s

Horror